Skagerrak is a 2003 Danish drama film directed by Søren Kragh-Jacobsen. It was entered into the 25th Moscow International Film Festival.

Cast 
 Iben Hjejle as Marie
 Bronagh Gallagher as Sophie
 Martin Henderson as Ian / Ken
 Ewen Bremner as Gabriel
 Gary Lewis as Willy
 Simon McBurney as Thomas
 Helen Baxendale as Stella
 James Cosmo as Robert

References

External links 
 

2003 films
2003 drama films
Danish drama films
2000s Danish-language films
Films directed by Søren Kragh-Jacobsen
Films with screenplays by Anders Thomas Jensen
Films shot in Edinburgh